The men's 100 metre freestyle event at the 1996 Summer Olympics took place on 22 July at the Georgia Tech Aquatic Center in Atlanta, United States. There were 60 competitors from 54 nations. Nations had been limited to two swimmers each since the 1984 Games. The event was won by Alexander Popov of Russia, the third man to successfully defend an Olympic title in the 100 metre freestyle (after Duke Kahanamoku in 1912 and 1920 and Johnny Weissmuller in 1924 and 1928). Gary Hall, Jr. returned the United States to the podium in the event after a one-Games absence. Gustavo Borges, the silver medalist in 1992, earned bronze. Popov and Borges were the 9th and 10th men to earn multiple medals in the event.

Background

This was the 22nd appearance of the men's 100 metre freestyle. The event has been held at every Summer Olympics except 1900 (when the shortest freestyle was the 200 metres), though the 1904 version was measured in yards rather than metres.

Four of the eight finalists from the 1992 Games returned: gold medalist Alexander Popov of the Unified Team (now competing for Russia), silver medalist Gustavo Borges of Brazil, fourth-place finisher Jon Olsen of the United States, and seventh-place finisher Christian Tröger of Germany.

In 1992, Popov defeated defending gold medalist Matt Biondi and proceeded to win every major 50 metre and 100 metre freestyle championship since Barcelona, including the 1994 world championships. Popov was the odds-on favorite. His biggest challenger was American Gary Hall, Jr., runner-up in the world championships.

Belarus, Bosnia and Herzegovina, Croatia, Kazakhstan, Kyrgyzstan, Moldova, Ukraine, and Uzbekistan each made their debut in the event. The United States made its 21st appearance, most of any nation, having missed only the boycotted 1980 Games.

Competition format

This freestyle swimming competition used the A/B final format instituted in 1984. The competition consisted of two rounds: heats and finals. The swimmers with the best 8 times in the semifinals advanced to the A final, competing for medals through 8th place. The swimmers with the next 8 times in the semifinals competed in the B final for 9th through 16th place. Swim-offs were used as necessary to determine advancement.

Records

Prior to this competition, the existing world and Olympic records were as follows.

No new world or Olympic records were set during the competition.

Schedule

All times are Eastern Daylight Time (UTC-4)

Results

Heats
Rule: The eight fastest swimmers advance to final A, while the next eight to final B.

Finals

Final B

Final A

Hall led going into the turn, but Popov led coming out of it. Hall caught Popov again in the second length, but Popov pulled away at the finish.

References

External links
 Official Report
 USA Swimming

Swimming at the 1996 Summer Olympics
Men's events at the 1996 Summer Olympics